Tell Brak , also spelled Tal Brak, is a village in northern Al-Hasakah Governorate, northeastern Syria. It is the nearest village to the site of historical Tell Brak.

Administratively the village belongs to the Nahiya Bir al-Helou al-Wardiya of al-Hasakah District. At the 2004 census, it had a population of 124.

References

Villages in al-Hasakah Governorate